Phil Wise (born April 25, 1949 in Omaha, Nebraska) is an American former football player who was selected by the New York Jets in the 6th round (136th overall) of the 1971 NFL Draft. Wise was 6'0", 192-lb. safety from the University of Nebraska at Omaha. Wise played in nine NFL seasons from 1971–76 with the Jets, and 1976-79 with the Minnesota Vikings. He finished his NFL career with 92 games and six interceptions.

Wise is also a member on The KQ92 Morning Show with Tom Barnard on KQRS-FM in Minneapolis, Minnesota.

External links

1949 births
Living people
Sportspeople from Omaha, Nebraska
Players of American football from Nebraska
American football safeties
Nebraska–Omaha Mavericks football players
South Dakota Coyotes football players
New York Jets players
Minnesota Vikings players